Royalty (stylized as R O Y A L T Y) is the sixth mixtape by American rapper and actor Donald Glover, under the stage name Childish Gambino. It was released by Glassnote Records on July 4, 2012. The album has many featured artists and is produced by Glover and his co-producer Ludwig Göransson, as well as Beck, Boi-1da and Skywlkr.

Background 
Although released on July 4, 2012, Glover announced the mixtape in January. After the announcement, there were various releases by Glover, including "Fuck Your Blog," that were not on the mixtape. Two other songs released since Royalty'''s announcement that are not included are "Eat Your Vegetables", released on April 2 through his website, and "Tell Me" featuring Himanshu Suri, better known as Heems of Das Racist, on the radio show "Chillin' Island". "Tell Me" was later released on Suri's mixtape Wild Water Kingdom.Glover has stated that he had recorded 25 songs for the mixtape. On May 14, Funkmaster Flex premiered "Unnecessary", featuring Schoolboy Q and Ab-Soul. On May 16, Glover released "We Ain't Them", produced by himself and frequent collaborator Ludwig. On May 26, Glover released another track, "Black Faces", through his website, featuring Nipsey Hussle and produced by Boi-1da. On May 30, he released a third track through his website which he named "Silk Pillow" (via his Twitter account), featuring Beck and produced by both Glover and Beck.

On July 3, 2012, Glover released the cover of the mixtape via Instagram and his Twitter account. The same day he released the track list via Twitter

 Critical reception Consequence of Sounds Chris Coplan gave the mixtape three out of five stars and found it "light on the punch lines, heavy on the swag, and an overall mighty declaration of newfound skill and confidence despite a few missteps" such as "lazy sing-talking". Corban Goble of Stereogum complimented the guest rappers and observed "a surprising amount of quality and variety for a free mixtape." Giving it a score of 8.3 out of 10, Adam Vitcavage of Paste praised Gambino's wordplay and cited the mixtape as "easily his most ambitious and controversial [release] yet." Although he felt it lacks the "sincerity and unique nature of Camp", Jason Gardner of AbsolutePunk rated the mixtape a 78% and wrote that "the rough and tumble beats and much less punchline-glazed lyricism make this mixtape a worthwhile experience both for creator and listener."

 Track listing Notes'''
  signifies a co-producer

References

External links 
 Download Royalty

2012 mixtape albums
Donald Glover albums
Albums produced by Boi-1da
Trap music albums